The Lycée Français International de Bangkok (LFIB, "French International High School of Bangkok") is a French international school in Wang Thonglang District, Bangkok. It serves elementary, middle, and high school levels.

References

 Lycée Français International de Bangkok
 Lycée Français International de Bangkok 
 Lycée Français International de Bangkok 

French international schools in Asia
International schools in Bangkok